Xushui District is a district of the city of Baoding, Hebei province, China.

Administrative divisions

Towns:
Ansu, Cuizhuang, Dayin, Suicheng, Gaolincun, Dawangdian, Caohe

Townships:
Dongshiduan Township, Liucun Township, Zhengcun Township, Humi Township, Puhe Township, Dongfushan Township, Yilianzhuang Township

Climate

References

Geography of Baoding
County-level divisions of Hebei